Sound of Boot is a 2008 Indian Malayalam-language crime thriller film directed by Shaji Kailas and written by Rajesh Jayaraman. It stars Suresh Gopi, Bala, Honey Rose and Murali.

Plot 
The film begins with a scene taking place in the Kakkayam police camp when a police officer is seen assaulting a prisoner. The scene then shifts to the retirement ceremony of three police officers - DYSP Abdul Sathar, IGP Raghavan Nambiar IPS and ADGP Thomas Sebastian IPS. Sathar is murdered on his way back home.

Holiday Home is a tourist resort in the high ranges of Kerala. It is frequented by tourists especially newly married couples who come for their honeymoon. Sankaranarayanan is the caretaker of the Holiday Home. Rahul Krishna comes to Holiday Home with his lover Meera Nambiar. The next day Meera Nambiar is found murdered, with SP Siddharth Mahadev being designated as the investigation officer. Everyone who is involved with the crime gives a different story to the SP.

The story later shifts back to the period when Indira Gandhi declared the state of emergency In India.
Sankaranarayanan was a local press baron. He and Anthony reported through the newspapers, the atrocities/rape faced by the female plantation workers due to the local police. Seeking revenge, the 3 police officers involved- DYSP Raghavan Nambiar, CI Abdul Sathar and SP Thomas Sebastian, brutally torture Sankaranarayanan and rape and murder Sankaranarayanan's wife and daughter and falsely implicate him in their murders. Sankaranarayanan reveals to Rahul that he is his son and they must take revenge against Nambiar, Sathar and Thomas Sebastian. Later Sathar retired from the police force as a DYSP, Nambiar retired as an IGP and Thomas Sebastin retired as an ADGP. Meera (Nambiar's daughter) is held captive by Sankaranarayanan. Rahul is against killing Meera since it was her father who had raped/murdered his sister and Meera must not be punished. Meera escapes the clutches of Sankaranarayanan with the help of Rahul. However while escaping Meera slips and hits a stone leading to her death.

Sankaranarayanan and Rahul murder Nambiar and Sathar but later Siddarth 
successfully arrests Shankaranarayanan when he attempted to attack Siddarth. When questioned, Shankaranarayanan revealed that his son Rahul would murder retired ADGP Thomas Sebastian. The ADGP Vincent Cherian asks Siddarth to arrest Rahul also and to protect Thomas Sebastian at any cost since Thomas was a close relative of Cherian. The next day when Siddarth and Aravind visited Thomas Sebastian at his home a gang led by Rahul made an attempt to attack him, but their attempt was foiled due to the timely intervention of Siddarth and Aravind. The entire gang was arrested by the police officers. However Janaki murders Thomas Sebastian. It is later known that Janaki is the wife of Sankaranarayanan and that she had survived the rape and attack and she had been alive all this time as a Palmist.

Cast 
 Suresh Gopi as SP Siddharth Mahadev IPS, the investigating officer
 Murali	as Sankaranarayanan
 Bala	as Rahul Krishna
 Krishnakumar as CI Aravind, a police officer who assists SP Siddarth in his investigation
 Bheeman Raghu	as Retd ADGP Thomas Sebastian IPS
 Rizabawa as Retd DySP Abdul Sathar
 Rajan P. Dev as Retd IGP Raghavan Nambiar IPS
 Honey Rose as Meera Nambiar
 Sona Nair as Janaki
 Lakshana as Sofiya Hassan
 Sonia Bose Venkat as Bhadra
 Biju Pappan as George Abraham
 Maniyanpilla Raju as Antony
 T. P. Madhavan as ADGP Vincent Cherian IPS
 Sangeetha Mohan as Compere		
 Chali Pala as	Peter, Driver
 Bindu Panicker as Mathaji

Reception
Rediff said that the film, "fairs a notch better than other recent outings of Suresh Gopi, because of the technical and scripting departments."

References

External links 
 
 

2008 films
2000s Malayalam-language films
Indian psychological thriller films
Fictional portrayals of the Kerala Police
Films shot in Munnar
Films directed by Shaji Kailas